Oleh Oleksandrovych Slobodyan (born 3 October 1996) is a Ukrainian professional footballer who plays as an attacking midfielder for Ukrainian club Obolon Kyiv.

Personal life 
He is the son of Oleksandr Slobodian, original CEO and current honorary president of beverages company Obolon and president of Obolon Kyiv.

References

External links
 Profile on Obolon Kyiv Rih official website
 

1996 births
Living people
Ukrainian footballers
Association football midfielders
FC Obolon-Brovar Kyiv players
FC Obolon-2 Kyiv players
Ukrainian First League players
Ukrainian Second League players